Sami Khamis Naqi Al-Hasani (born 29 January 1992), commonly known as Sami Al-Hasani, is an Omani footballer who plays for Sur SC.

Club career statistics

International career

Sami is part of the first team squad of the Oman national football team. He was selected for the national team for the first time in 2013. He made his first appearance for Oman  on 25 December 2013 against Bahrain in the 2014 WAFF Championship. He has made appearances in the 2014 WAFF Championship and the 2015 AFC Asian Cup qualification.

International goals
Scores and results list Oman's goal tally first.

References

External links
 
 
 
 

1992 births
Living people
People from Sur, Oman
Omani footballers
Oman international footballers
Association football midfielders
Sur SC players
Oman Professional League players